Cupul National Airport  is an airport located in Tizimín, Yucatan, Mexico.

References

Airports in Yucatán